BnF Français 25516 is a late-13th century illuminated manuscript held in the Bibliothèque nationale de France.

Content

The quarto manuscript has 209 folios, with Old French text written in two columns in a small 13th-c hand. It is heavily illuminated, and the illuminations are accompanied by explanatory rubrics. Large initials are found at the beginnings of chapters and other significant passages; the usual small initials are done alternately in red and blue.
It contains four romances:
 Bevis of Hampton (1–75); 22 miniatures
 Elie de Saint Gille (76–95); 6 miniatures
 Aiol and Mirabel (96–173); 11 miniatures
 Robert the Devil (174–209); 11 miniatures

Notes

Bibliography

Gallery

External links
 Français 25516 at Bibliothèque nationale de France
 BnF Français 25516 on Archives de littérature du moyen âge. Laurent Brun, updated May 2, 2018.

13th-century illuminated manuscripts
Bibliothèque nationale de France collections